Poongulam is a village in Thiruvarur district in the Indian state of Tamil Nadu.

Temples 
It has four temples: Varasithi Vinayagar, Agastheeswarar (Shiva), Mariamman (Kali), and Ayyanar.

Economy 
Agriculture is the primary industry. Many workers left their farms to work in a neighboring village.

Governance 
The village is subject to Panchayat Veedthivedangan.

References

Villages in Tiruvarur district